Oria (or Orra, ;  or ,) is a town and comune in the Apulia region, in the province of Brindisi, in southern Italy. It is the seat of the Roman Catholic Diocese of Oria.

History 
In classical times, Oria was known as Hyria (Uria) or Hyrium, a city in ancient Messapia and one of the principal Messapian cities. It was just north of the ancient town Manduria, at some distance southwest of Brundisium, and southeast of Taras/Tarentum; corresponding to the location of the modern town.

According to Herodotus (7.170), it was founded by the Messapians (who according to Herodotus were originally Cretans) sometime after the abortive siege of the Sicanian city Camicus. Messapians were probably of Illyrian origin. Between 217 and 84 BC the city was minting its own coins. The coins often feature Iapagus, the Iapygian national hero.

Hyria was conquered by the Romans. It was destroyed in AD 924 and 977. In 1266, Oria was besieged by Manfred of Sicily.

Main sights
Castle, mostly the result of modifications from the early 13th century under Frederick II Hohenstaufen and, later, under the Angevines, who added two cylindrical towers. 
Gate of the Jews (Italian: Porta degli Ebrei).
 Oria Cathedral: Basilica, built from 1750 over a pre-existing building damaged by an earthquake. The interior houses numerous paintings from the 17th to the 20th century. The exterior is commanded by the large polychrome dome.
 San Domenico: church built from 1572. The interior has Baroque paintings, while also notable is the cloister of the annexed convent.
 San Francesco d'Assisi
 San Francesco da Paola: late 16th century church
San Giovanni Battista: church originally built in the 14th century but later included in a large Baroque edifice in the 17th century.
Grotto church of Madonna della Scala.
Bishop's Palace (16th century)
Sanctuary of San Cosimo alla Macchia

Jewish presence 

Oria had one of the oldest Jewish communities in Europe.  Jewish scholarship in Oria included the study of philosophy, the Talmud, languages such as Greek and Latin, and medicine and natural sciences.  It was home to Shefatya ben Amitai and Shabbethai Donnolo, one of the first Hebrew writers who was native to Europe.

Ten scholars in the community were killed when Arabs under Abu Ahmad Ja'far ibn 'Ubaid conquered Oria in July 4 925. This was the beginning of the end of Jewish presence in Oria; the last relic was an epitaph produced in 1035.  It is likely, however, that Jews were living in Oria until the 15th century.

People 
Jewish scholar and writer Shabbethai Donnolo was born in Oria in 913.

The neoclassisictic writer Francesco Milizia was born in Oria in 1725.

Twin cities 
Oria is twinned with:
 Lorch, Germany.
 Miekinia, Poland.
 Sarteano, Italy.

Notes

External links 
Official Oria tourist site
Jewish Encyclopedia entry on Oria
 Video Tournament Medioeval of Oria – and Meteo Oria

Cities and towns in Apulia
Localities of Salento
Italian Jewish communities